Buturlino is the name of several inhabited localities in Russia.

Urban localities
Buturlino, Nizhny Novgorod Oblast, a work settlement in Buturlinsky District of Nizhny Novgorod Oblast

Rural localities
Buturlino, Moscow Oblast, a village in Dankovskoye Rural Settlement of Serpukhovsky District of Moscow Oblast
Buturlino, Penza Oblast, a selo in Znamensko-Pestrovsky Selsoviet of Issinsky District of Penza Oblast